The 2019–20 EFL League Two (referred to as the Sky Bet League Two for sponsorship reasons) was the 16th season of Football League Two under its current title and the 28th season under its current league division format. On 13 March 2020, the EFL, alongside the FA announced the suspension of all domestic football until 3 April due to the rapidly developing COVID-19 pandemic. On 3 April 2020, this suspension was extended indefinitely.

On 15 May 2020, the clubs voted to end the season with immediate effect with the final table being determined on a points-per-game basis. No decision was made as to promotion and relegation. The play-offs would be played as normal. The decision meant Swindon Town would be crowned champions and would be joined by Crewe Alexandra and Plymouth Argyle in League One the following season.

Team changes
The following teams have changed division since the 2018–19 season.

Stadiums

Personnel and sponsoring

Managerial changes

League table

Play-offs

Results

Season statistics

Top scorers

Hat-tricks

Notes

References

 
EFL League Two seasons
1
2
Eng
England